This is an incomplete list of television series, which can or may never satisfy any objective standard for completeness. Revisions and additions are welcome.

This is a list of television series about, or set in schools or classrooms.  It also includes television shows about school teachers and students as well.

0–9
 100 Things to Do Before High School (2014–2016)
 21 Jump Street (1987–1991)
 13 Reasons Why (2017–2020)
 90210 (2008–2013)

A
 Abbott Elementary (2020-Present)
 Ackley Bridge (2017–present)
 All Grown Up! (2003–2008)
 American Vandal (2017–2018)
 The Amazing World of Gumball (2011–2019)
 A.N.T. Farm (2011–2014)
 A.P. Bio (2018–2021)
 As the Bell Rings (2007–2011)
 As Told by Ginger (2000–2009)
 Assassination Classroom (2015–present)
 Awkward (2011–2016)
 Atypical (2017–2021)

B
 Baby (2018–2020)
 Bad Education (2012–2014)
 Bad Teacher (2014)
 Becoming Human (2011)
 Bert (1994)
 The Best Years (2007–2009)
 Big School (2013–2014)
 Billy Bunter of Greyfriars School (1952–1961)
 Black Lightning (2018–present)
 Blood & Water (2020–present)
 Boston Common (1996–1997)
 Boston Public (2000–2004)
 Boy Meets World (1993—2000)
 Braceface (2001–2005)
 Breaker High (1997–1998)
 Buffy the Vampire Slayer (1997–2003)

C
 California Dreams (1992-1996)
 The Carrie Diaries (2013–2014)
 Chalk (1997)
 Chambers (2019)
 Chilling Adventures of Sabrina (2018–2020)
 Christy (1994–1995)
 Chris Cross (1994–1995)
 Class (2016)
 Class of 3000 (2006–2008)
 Clone High (2002–2003)
 City Guys (1997–2001)
 Cobra Kai (2018–present)
 Community (2009–2015)
 Control Z (2020–present)
 Cow and Chicken (1997–1999)

D
 Dangerous Minds (1996–1997)
 Danny Phantom (2004–2007)
 Dare Me (2019)
 Dark (2017–2020)
 Dawson's Creek (1998–2003)
 Daybreak (2019)
 Deadly Class (2019)
 Degrassi
The Kids of Degrassi Street (1979–1986)
Degrassi Junior High (1987–1989)
Degrassi High (1989–1991)
Degrassi: The Next Generation (2001–2015)
 Detention (1999–2000)
 Detentionaire (2011–2015)
 Different World (1987–1993)
 Do Over (2002)
 Doug (1991–1999)
 Drake & Josh (2004–2007)
 Drexell's Class (1991–1992)

E
 Ed, Edd n Eddy (season 5) (2005–2007)
 Edgemont (2001–2005)
 Educating (2011–2020)
 Educating Essex (2011)
 Educating Yorkshire (2013)
 Educating the East End (2014)
 Educating Cardiff (2015)
 Educating Greater Manchester (2017)
 Eko Eko Azarak (1997)
 Elite (2018–present)
 The Emperor's New School (2006)
 Euphoria (2019–present)
 Even Stevens (2000–2003)
 Every Witch Way (2014–2015)
 Everything Sucks! (2018)

F
 Faking It (2014–2016)
 Fame (1982–1987)
Family Reunion (2019-present)
 Ferris Bueller (1990–1991)
 The Fosters (2013–2018)
 Freaks and Geeks (1999–2000) 
 Friday Night Lights (2006–2011)

G
 Game Shakers (2015–2019)
 Generation (2021)
 Get Even (2020–present)
 Get Real (1999-2000)
 Gilmore Girls (2000–2007)
 Girl Meets World (2014–2017)
 Glee (2009–2015)
 Good Morning, Miss Bliss (1988-1989)
 Gossip Girl (2007–2012)
 Gossip Girl (2021–present)
Grand Army (2020)
 Grange Hill (1978–2008)
 Great Teacher Onizuka (1999–2000)
 Greek (2007–2011)
 Greenhouse Academy (2017–2020)
 Great Indian School, India (2017–present)

H
 Half Moon Investigations (2009)
 Hank (1965–1966)
 Hang Time (1995–2000)
 Hangin' with Mr. Cooper (1992–1997)
 Hank Zipzer (2014–2016)
 Hannah Montana (2006–2011)
 Head of the Class (1986–1991)
 Head of the Class (2021)
 Heartbreak High (1994–1999)
 Hearts and Minds (1995)
Henry Danger (2014-2020)
 Hemlock Grove (2013–2015)
 Hero Elementary (2020–present)
 He's Into Her (2021)
 Hex (2004–2005)
 Hey Arnold! (1996–2004)
 High School Musical: The Musical: The Series (2019–present)
 Hope and Glory (1999–2000)
 House of Anubis (2011–2013)
How To Rock (2012)
 How to Sell Drugs Online (Fast) (2019–present)

I
 I Am Not Okay with This (2020)
 iCarly (2007–2012)
 Inbetweeners (2008–2010)
 Insatiable (2018–2019)
 Invader Zim (2001–2006)

K
 K-On! (2009–2010)
 Knight School (1997–1998)
 Kim Possible (2002–2007)

L
 Life As We Know It (2004–2005)
 Life with Derek (2005–2009)
 Lizzie McGuire (2001–2004)
 The Loud House (2016–present)
 Love, Victor (2020–present)

M
 Make It Pop (2015–2016)
 Majisuka Gakuen (2010–2011)
 Maya & Miguel (2004–2007)
 Mischievous Twins: The Tales of St. Clare's (1991)
 Miss/Guided (2007–2008)
 Mister Peepers (1952–1955)
 Mr. D (2012–2018)
 Mr. Iglesias (2019–2020)
 Mr. Novak  (1963–1965)
 Mr. Rhodes (1996–1997)
 Mr. Young (2011–2013)
 My Gym Partner’s a Monkey (2005–2008)
 My Life As A College Student (2015–2016)
 My Life As A College Student 2: The Adventure Continues (2016–2017)
 My Life As Liz (2009–2011)
 My So-Called Life (1994–1995)

N
 Ned's Declassified School Survival Guide (2003–2007)
Never Have I Ever (2020-present)
 The New Worst Witch (2005–2006)
Nicky,Ricky,Dicky & Dawn (2014-2018)
 Nový život (2020–present)

O
 The O.C. (2003–2007)
 One Tree Hill (2003–2012)
 Opposite Sex (2000)
 Our Miss Brooks (1952–1956)
 Once Upon A Time (2011–2018)
 On My Block (2018–present)

P
 Paper Chase (1978–79, 1983–86)
 Parker Lewis Can't Lose (1990–1993)
 Pepper Ann (1997–2001)
 Please Sir! (1968–1972)
 The Politician (2019–2020)
 Popular (1999–2001)
 Pretty Little Liars (2010–2017)

Q
 Quicksand (2019)

R
 Recess (1997–2001)
 Rita (2012–2020)
 Riverdale (2017–present)
 Room 222 (1969–1974)
 Roswell (1996–2003)

S

 Santa Clarita Diet (2017–2019)
 Saved by the Bell (1989–1993)
 Saved by the Bell: The College Years (1993–1994)
 Saved by the Bell: The New Class (1993–2000)
 Saved by the Bell (2020 TV series) (2020-present)
 The Secret Life of the American Teenager (2008–2013)
 The Secret Circle (2011–2012)
 School of Rock (2016–2018)
 Schooled (2019–2020)
 Scream (2015–2019)
 Sex Education (2019–present)
 Seven Periods With Mr. Gormsby (2005–2006)
 Sidekick (2010–2013)
 Skam (2015–2017)
 Skins (2007–2013)
 Sky Castle (2018–2019)
 Smart Guy (1997–1999)
 So Awkward (2015–2021)
 The Society (2019)
 South Park (1997–present)
 Split (2009–2012)
 Square Pegs (1982-1983)
 Strange Days at Blake Holsey High (2002–2006)
 Stranger Things (2016–present)
 Strangers with Candy (1999–2000)
 The Suite Life of Zack and Cody (2005–2008)
 The Suite Life on Deck (2008–2011)
 Suburgatory (2011–2014)
 Summer Heights High (2007)
 Summerhill (2008)
 Superhero Kindergarten (2021–present)
 Supernoobs (2015-2019)
 Sweat (1996)
 Sweet Valley High (1994–1997)
 Switched at Birth (2011–2017)

T
 Teachers (2001–2004)
 Teachers (2006)
 Teachers (2016–2019)
 Teachers Only (1982–1983)
 Teen Wolf (2011–2017)
 The Melancholy of Haruhi Suzumiya (2006–2009)
 The Demon Headmaster (1996–1998)
 The End of the F***ing World (2017-2019)
The Worst Witch (2017-2020)
 This Man Craig (1966–1967)
 Those Who Can't (2016–2019)
 Three Seven Eleven (1993–1994)
 Timothy Goes to School (2000–2001)
 Tom Brown's Schooldays (1971–1973)
 Toradora! (2006)
 Tower Prep (2009)
 Trinkets (2019–present)

U

 Undeclared (2001–2002)
 Undergrads (2001)
 Unfabulous (2004–2007)
 Unnatural History (2010)
 USA High (1997–1999)

V
 The Vampire Diaries (2009–2017)
 Vampire High (2001–2002)
 Veronica Mars (2004–2007, 2014, 2019)
 Vice Principals (2016–2017)
 Victorious (2010–2013)

W
 Waterloo Road (2006–2015)
 Wayside (2007–2008)
 We Are the Wave (2019)
 Welcome Back, Kotter (1975–1979)
 Welcome Freshmen (1991–1993)

Y
 Young Americans (2000)
 Young Sheldon (2017–present)

Z
 Zoey 101 (2005–2008)

See also
List of songs about school
Lists of anime, including numerous television series about school
List of comedy anime
List of drama anime
List of harem (genre) anime and manga
List of romance anime
List of slice of life anime

References

Lists of television series by genre
Television series about school
TV
Works about adolescence